Winning Back His Love is a 1910 silent film short directed by D. W. Griffith.

A surviving Griffith short on the paper print.

Cast
Wilfred Lucas - Frederick Wallace
Stephanie Longfellow - Mrs. Frederick Wallace
Vivian Prescott - Vera Blair
Edwin August- A Friend
Alfred Paget - A Servant
Jeanie MacPherson - A Servant

other cast
Dorothy Bernard - 
Verner Clarges - 
Charles Craig - A Waiter
Donald Crisp - At Stage Door
Frank Evans - At Stage Door
Joseph Graybill - At Stage Door
Robert Harron - At Stage Door
Guy Hedlund - At Stage Door
Harry Hyde - At Stage Door

See also
 List of American films of 1910

References

External links
 Winning Back His Love at IMDb.com

Winning Back His Love available for free download at Internet Archive

1910 films
American silent short films
Films directed by D. W. Griffith
Biograph Company films
1910s romantic drama films
American romantic drama films
American black-and-white films
1910 drama films
1910s American films
Silent romantic drama films
Silent American drama films
American drama short films